Ring expansion and ring contraction reactions in the course of organic synthesis refer to a set of reactions which can lead to the expansion or contraction of an existing ring. This often makes it possible to access structures that would be difficult if not impossible to synthesise with single cyclization reactions. Ring expansions are valuable because they allow access to larger systems that are difficult to synthesize through a single cyclization due to the slow rate of formation. Ring contractions are useful for making smaller, more strained rings from larger rings. Expansions are classified  by the mechanism of expansion and the atom(s) added; contractions are characterized simply by the reactive intermediate which performs the contraction.

Description 
In the course of an organic synthesis, a chemist often needs to form a new or alter an existing ring. Ring expansion and ring contraction reactions are used to expand or contract an existing ring, often making it possible to access structures that would be difficult if not impossible to synthesise with single cyclization reactions.

Ring expansion reactions 

Ring expansions are valuable because they allow access to larger systems that are difficult to synthesize through a single cyclization due to the slow rate of formation (seven member and larger rings). Classifying ring expansions by the mechanism of expansion and the atom(s) added allows one to see the similarities between different expansions methods and different incorporated atoms. The broadest classification comes by the mechanism of expansion. The rings can be expanded by attack of the ring onto an outside group already appended to the ring (a migration/insertion), opening of a bicycle to a single larger ring, or coupling a ring closing with an expansion. These expansions can be further broken down by what type of atom they incorporate (a carbon or a heteroatom) into the expanded ring.

Carbon insertion reactions 
Carbon insertions are tremendously useful reactions which introduce an additional carbon atom into the ring. These reactions are used in the synthesis of many drugs and natural products. These can proceed through any of the mechanisms listed below.

Carbon insertion through migration to an exocyclic group 
These reactions have the general features of having an exocyclic leaving group on a carbon adjacent to the ring and an electron donating group on the ring capable of initiating a migration of an endocyclic bond.

A common migration introduction of carbon is a pinacol rearrangement. While this reaction refers specifically to a vicinal dihydroxide rearrangement, there are other pinacol type rearrangements that proceed through the same general mechanism such as the Tiffeneau-Demjanov rearrangement. These "semipinacol rearrangements" occur under milder conditions and are thus preferable in complex syntheses. These reactions are useful beyond simply expanding a ring because the exocyclic group attacked may also have other functionality appended to it besides the leaving group. The group to which the endocyclic bond migrates can also be selectively added to the ring based on the functionality already present, for example 1,2 addition into a cyclic ketone.

Carbon insertion through opening of a bicycle 

Carbon introduction through the opening of a bicyclic system is another way to introduce either a single carbon or several at a time to a ring. The single carbon introduction often goes through a cyclopropane containing bicyclic intermediate, which is subsequently opened to give the expanded ring. The expansion can occur either through an electrocylic ring opening or by an induced cleavage of the shared bond.

These reactions are differentiated in terms of how the carbon is added to form the cyclopropane ring. A Simmons-Smith like reaction with an alkene containing ring can be used to introduce a single carbon. Other methods exist to cyclopropantate other functionalities, such as the Buchner ring expansion fornucleophihlic attack (A) and neighboring group donation (B).The formation of the cyclopropane ring in a single carbon expansion allows the introduction of additional functionality along with the ring expansion, provided the additional functionality is appended to the carbon being inserted. The target of cyclopropanation also varies depending on the conditions used. The Simmons-Smith reaction adds to alkenes while the Buchner ring expansion allows addition to typically unreactive arenes. The Buchner ring expansion is useful because it gives cycloheptatrienes as the ring opened products, which are found in the core of some natural products, such as azulenes. An important consideration in these ring expansions is the ring opening to an expanded ring and not an exocyclic group on the original ring or an unopenable product. The Buchner ring expansion is encouraged to open to the desired product by placing electron withdrawing groups on the carbon added. In order to perform the ring opening on saturated bicyclic molecules the cyclopropane must be introduced such that a neighboring group can facilitate the expansion or the ring must be opened by attackate the expansion or the ring must be opened by attack from an outside group.

Ring opening as a means of ring expansion can also be applied to larger systems to give access to even larger ring syscyclization. The Grob fragmentation can be applied as an example of such an expansion. Like the pinacol type migration the Grob fragmentation relies on an electron donating group to promote the bond migration and encourage the leaving group to be expelled. In this case the electron donating group can be a pseudo electron donating group which is capable of eliminating and donating an electron pair into the carbon with the breaking bond. Working with two smaller rings can allow for elaboration of two parts of the molecule separately before working with the expanded ring. The Dowd-Beckwith ring expansion is also capable of adding several carbons to a ring at a time,e of adding several carbons to a ring at a time, and is a useful tool for making large rings. While it proceeds through an intermediate bicycle the final cyclization and ring opening take place within the same radical reaction. This expansion is useful because it allows the expansion of a beta-ketoester to a large cyclic ketone which can easily be elaborated using either the cyclic ketone or the exocyclic ester.

Heteroatom insertion reactions 
Heteroatom additions to rings can occur through ring expansions if not they are not done through de-novo ring synthesis. These introductions are primarily ring expansions because they often take place through migration/insertion pathways similar to those mentioned above for carbon. Examples include high impact applications of the Beckmann rearrangement (for introduction of nitrogen into codeine) and the Baeyer-Villiger oxidation (introduction of oxygen to cage-annulated ethers) in synthesis. Both occur with the expulsion of a leaving group as the alkyl group migrates onto the exocyclic heteroatom, which is strikingly similar to the pinacol type rearrangement.

Ring contraction reactions 

Ring contractions are useful for making smaller, more strained rings from larger rings. The impetus for making these rings comes from the difficulty associated with making a fully elaborated small ring when such a ring could more easily be made from an elaborated larger ring, from which an atom can be excised, or that the original larger scaffold is more accessible.

Ring contractions are easily characterized simply by the reactive intermediate which performs the contraction. The standard intermediates are anionic, cationic, and carbenoid.

Anionic contractions 
The Favorskii rearrangement is the poster child of the anionic ring contractions. It proceeds through a carbanion which attacks an endocyclic carbon and expels a leaving group (a halide) forming a bicyclic molecule with rings smaller than the original. The bicycle is then opened by nucleophilic attack on the ketone to give the contracted product.

An alternative to the standard Favorskii rearrangement, is to perform what can be thought of as a negative pinacol rearrangement where an anionic group encourages a bond aligned with a leaving group to migrate and expel the leaving group, which has been used in several syntheses. It should also be noted that the so-called "quasi-Favorskii rearrangement" proceeds without an additional nucleophile to form the final contracted product.

Cation contractions 
The cationic rearrangement contraction proceeds through the loss of a leaving group and the migration of an endocyclic bond to the carbocation. Pinacol type rearrangements are often used for this type of contraction. Like the expansion reaction this proceeds with an electron donating group aiding in the migration.

Contraction reactions of one ring can be coupled with an expansion of another to give an unequal bicycle from equally sized fused ring. These cationic rearrangements have found use to synthesize the cores of complex molecules.

Carbenoid contractions 

The Wolff rearrangement can be used to perform ring contractions. It proceeds through a carbenoid generated from decomposition of a diazoketone, which inserts into the carbon-carbon bond on the opposite side of the ketone.

References

Rearrangement reactions